The Papua New Guinea Greens Party or PNG Greens are a minor political party in Papua New Guinea. Founded in 2001, the party took part in the 2002, 2007, 2012 and 2017 general elections, without winning a seat. They are a member of the Global Greens and of the Asia Pacific Greens Federation.

Per its constitution, the party campaigns for environmentally sustainable development, participatory democracy, an "equitable distribution of social and natural resources […] to meet basic human needs unconditionally", and respect for "cultural, linguistic, ethnic, sexual, religious and spiritual diversity within the context of individual responsibility toward all beings".

In the 2012 general election, the party was led by Dorothy Tekwie and stood twenty-five candidates, of whom ten were women, in a country where women remain vastly under-represented in politics. None were elected. Tekwie herself unsuccessfully stood against incumbent Deputy Prime Minister Belden Namah in the Vanimo-Green River constituency.

Policies 
The Papua New Guinea Greens Party firstly state that they will uphold the objectives within their constitution, and integrate them into the legislative system of Papua New Guinea should they be elected. Their main principles are those of sustainable living, high education levels, supporting the ecosystem, upholding human rights and increasing fair democracy within PNG.

The PNG Greens agree with Vision 2050 aims, although emphasise the need for sustainability to be a main goal globally.

They support the goals of the global greens, of:
 environmental sustainability 
 social equality and economic justice
 grassroots democracy
 peace, disarmament and non-violence.
They uphold the four pillars of sustainability, namely:
 social sustainability
 environmental sustainability
 economic sustainability
 good governance
They commit to upholding Ecological Sustainable Development (ESD), with the six principles being:
 precautionary principle, important in all decision-making to minimise negative and unacceptable risk;
 inter-generational equity, ensuring future generations have a sustainable future;
 intra-generational equity, which means social equity and economic justice for all people;
 integration of environmental, economic and social aspects into decision-making with institutional sustainability and good governance and ensuring mechanisms and institutions are in place to foster this integration;
 conservation of biological diversity and ecological integrity as being fundamental to the maintenance of healthy, productive and functioning ecosystems, and providing humans with their basic needs and by maintaining ecosystem services;
 improved valuation, pricing and incentive mechanisms so as to ensure that environmental factors are included in the valuation of assets and services., e.g. putting a monetary value on ecosystem services and biodiversity conservation.
They are committed to the PNG Population Policy.

They promise to minimise or negate their carbon footprint.

They strive to achieve the Millennium Development Goals, which are:
 Eradicate Extreme Hunger and Poverty       
 Achieve Universal Primary Education    
 Promote Gender Equality and Empower Women   
 Reduce Child Mortality 
 Improve Maternal Health  
 Combat HIV/AIDS, Malaria and other diseases  
 Ensure Environmental Sustainability    
 Develop a Global Partnership for Development 
                                                                                                            
PNG Greens Party is committed to raising PNG's Human Development Index (HDI) with a target of being in the top 50 countries in the world by 2030.

PNG Greens Party promises to campaign against violence against all individuals, in particular women and children.

Within their mission statement the PNG Greens reject enforcement of limiting population growth by any enforcement means. They believe population growth can be limited by the following means:

 protection of free choice in sexual and reproductive health
 improve literacy, numeracy, and health 
 provide sex education
 provide free contraception 
 remove a laws that inhibit people's contraceptive choices 
 Make all people legally equal regardless of sexual orientation, whether male or female. 
They recognise the need to improve the lives of people living in rural settlements within PNG.

They state in their mission statement that PNG has "amongst the highest biodiversity and cultural diversity amongst all countries of the world." and that they are "committed to maintaining that diversity and oppose all policies which reduce either."

They support increasing the number of conservation protected areas, and involving a co-operative management approach between local communities, NGOs, and the government. They also supports the establishment of more WMAs, and more locally managed marine protected areas. They would like to use these initiatives to increase eco-tourism. It will promote more eco-businesses, with this same aim.  PNG Greens believe financial assistance from government, NGOs, business groups and others is needed to manage protected areas, and to stamp out inappropriate development.

Papua New Guinea has one of the most significant timber resources in Asia. In the last two decades, PNG logging has seen the most forest loss and degradation in the world. PNG Greens oppose unsustainable logging practices and clear felling of PNG's forests. The PNG Greens are committed to enforcing forestry standards which are the law. They wish to implement more policies in support of community and eco-forestry practices which are sustainable.

They oppose unsustainable agriculture. They propose for all SABLs to be immediately rescinded.

The PNG Greens call attention to the fact that hydrocarbons are contributing to greenhouse gas emissions. They call for immediate policy change to ensure that benefits of extraction companies within PNG are seen by all citizens of PNG. If elected they will immediately stop dumping of mine wastes into rivers and the sea. They will strive to match greenhouse gas contributions with complementary/ conservation offsets. and REDD activities.

PNG Greens support policies to mitigate environmental pollution of rivers, lakes, and marine areas.

Constitution

Motto 
The motto of the PNG Greens is "Changing the way the world communicates."

Objectives 
 Ensure human activity does not impair biodiversity and the ecological resilience of life supporting systems
 To strive for participatory democracy where all citizens have freedom of expression, and are able to participate directly in economic, social, and environmental issues which affect them. Where power and responsibilities are locally and regionally concentrated, so that higher tiers of government make decisions where absolutely necessary, which requires that:
 Individuals are empowered with the access to all the required information to make necessary decisions, and all have access to education to allow participation.
 Wealth and power inequalities are diminished to ensure equal ability to participate.
 Grassroots institutions are put in place to enable decisions to be made on a local level, by those affected. These institutions would be based on a system which encourages volunteering, civil vitality and communal responsibility.
 Electoral systems are democratic and transparent, and this is enforced within legislation.
 Each adult has one vote, and all votes are equal.
 Electoral systems are built on proportional representation, all elections are publicly funded, and any corporate and private donation is fully transparent and strictly legislated.
 All citizens have the right to choose what political party they are a member of, within a multi-party system.
 Social justice: distributing of social and natural resources, both locally and internationally, to unconditionally meet basic human rights. Also to ensure that all citizens have equal opportunities for social and personal development by ensuring:
 We "eradicate poverty by developing initiatives that address the causes as well as the system of poverty".
 Citizenship is based on the idea of equal rights, irrespective of gender, age, class, religion, disability, ethnic or national origin, wealth, or health.
 Non-violence: committed to non-violence and striving for global peace and cooperation. Security should be not be measured in terms of military strength, but of sound economic and social development, upholding human rights, environmental safety, requiring:
 A policy of non-violent conflict resolution, with a self-reliant non-nuclear defence policy.
 A global security system committed to preventing and managing conflicts.
 Remove main causes of conflict by respecting and understanding different cultures, promoting freedom and democracy, ending poverty, and eradicating racism.
 Sustainability: Recognise the limits of global material expansion, and the need to achieve sustainability of both renewable and non-renewable sources, in order to provide this and future generations with a habitable environment, which requires us to:
 Limit consumption by wealthy people to ensure all have a fair share of resources.
 Reduce causes of population growth by giving economic security, access to education and health services, and greater control over fertility choices for both males and females.
 To measure national wealth in terms of quality of life, as opposed to the capacity for over-consumption.
 Provide aims designed to satisfy the needs for all, not the greed of a few, enabling present generations to meet their needs without jeopardising future generations.
 Enforce transnational corporations to support the principles of sustainable development.
 Apply tax mechanisms to speculative financial flow, as well as increased tax regulation.
 Respect diversity, by honouring cultural, religious, sexual, ethical, linguistic and spiritual diversity with onus of individuals to be responsible towards all beings. Defend every person's rights indiscriminately, upholding their dignity, health and well-being, and promote responsible, respectful, and positive relationships across all walks of life within a multi-cultural community. This requires:
 Recognise rights of indigenous people, including right to land, self-determination, and acknowledgement of their cultural contributions.
 Recognise rights of ethnic minorities to develop culturally, socially, and to use a language of their preference and full legal right to participate democratically.
 Promote gender equality.
 Political Actions:
 Encourage grassroots movements, and other organisations which strive for democratic, transparent, civil society, and accountable governments locally and globally.
 Support young people to have a democratic say in society, through positive encouragement to participate and education.
 Push for "certification of the organisation for Economic co-operation and Development (OECD) convention on combating Bribery of Foreign Public Officials in International Business."
 Make it a right for all citizens to have access to free official information, and access to independent media.
 Strive towards universal access to electronic communications, and IT, starting with radio and community-based email and internet.
 Put in place a fair and just, secular legal system. Give citizens the right of defence, and proportionality between crime and punishment.
 Hold publicly funded elections.
 Ensure all electoral donations are fully transparent.
 Cap electoral donations from a single person.
 Ban party political and electoral donations from private organisations.
 Challenge corporate domination of government, which denies citizens their right to participate democratically.
 Support separation of legal, executive, and judicial systems.
 Separate state from religion.
 Globalisation: 
 Facilitate a fair trading arrangement between all nations.
 Increase development assistance to 3rd World countries.
 Abolish third world debt.
 Oppose human rights violations and political oppression.

Other terms 
The constitution also contains terms of voting on policy, membership, funding, parliamentary representation, by-laws, and a variety of other topics.

Electoral representation 
In 2012, the PNG Greens Party put forward candidates in many areas, notably in Madang province, where the party endorsed candidates for all of the seven seats.

References

Green political parties
Greens
Political parties established in 2001
Global Greens member parties
2001 establishments in Papua New Guinea